"To Serve Man" is a science fiction short story by American writer Damon Knight. It first appeared in the November 1950 issue of Galaxy Science Fiction and has been reprinted a number of times, including in Frontiers in Space (1955),  Far Out (1961), and The Best of Damon Knight (1976).

Synopsis 
The story is set in the United States in a time that appears to be contemporaneous with the story's 1950 publication date. It is told in first-person narrative by a United Nations translator. The story opens at a special session of the UN where three alien emissaries are testifying that the purpose of their mission to Earth is to bring humans "the peace and plenty which we ourselves enjoy, and which we have in the past brought to other races throughout the galaxy". The aliens, who are large humanoid pigs with three fingers on each hand, soon supply Earth with cheap unlimited power, boundless supplies of food, and a device which disables all modern armies by suppressing all explosions, and they begin work on drugs for prolonging life. As a further token of friendship, they allow humans to visit their home planet via ten-year "exchange groups".

The narrator has trusted the emissaries from the time of their arrival, but his friend and fellow translator Grigori has not. Grigori dismisses any notion of disinterested altruism and is certain that the aliens have an ulterior motive underlying their actions. He is determined to discover what they stand to gain by helping humans and takes a job at the alien embassy to learn their language. This affords him access to an alien dictionary, and he later steals an alien book, hoping to translate it. 

The narrator has also left the UN to work at the embassy, and the two determine that the book's title is How to Serve Man. Two weeks later, the narrator returns from a trip to find Grigori distraught, having discovered to his horror that the title is a double entendre. Grigori informs the narrator that he has translated the first paragraph of the book and has determined that it is not a treatise on serving humanity, but a cookbook.

Awards 
In 2001, the story was awarded a Retro Hugo Award as the "Best Short Story of 1951".

Adaptations 
Knight's story was adapted for use as a 1962 episode of the television series The Twilight Zone, in which the aliens are portrayed as seven foot tall humans with dome-like heads.

References in other works 
 In John Ringo's book A Hymn Before Battle, "To Serve Man" is mentioned as a classic example of aliens seeming to be benevolent, while in fact using humans for their own purposes.
 George Scithers wrote a cookbook named for the story.
 Cattle Decapitation titled an album after the story.  
 James Michener's Space features characters reading the story.
 In The Naked Gun 2½: The Smell of Fear during a panic after Dr. Albert Meinheimer's speech, the character Terence Baggett holds a copy of the book To Serve Man, proclaiming "It's a cookbook!" The joke is that Terence Baggett is played by Lloyd Bochner, who was the lead in the Twilight Zone adaptation of the story.
 The Simpsons season 2 episode 3 parodies the story as "Hungry Are the Damned", inverting the twist so the aliens are insulted at being suspected after genuinely altruistic intent.
 In Married... with Children episode "Sofa so good", Al Bundy, off screen, yells to his wife Peggy "Peg, To serve man? It's a cookbook!"
 In the first Madagascar movie, when discussing the "Fossa", one of the lemurs holds up a book titled To Serve Lemur and proclaims "It's a cookbook!"
 In Cataclysm: Dark Days Ahead, there is a book entitled To Serve Man which contains crafting recipes of food requiring human flesh.  The book's description is "It's... it's a cookbook!"
 In Matthew Costello's Doom 3: Worlds on Fire, Swann tells his superior about To Serve Man as being a real book discovered in the 1950s.

See also 
 Under the Skin
 "From Gustible's Planet", a short story by Cordwainer Smith

References

External links

 "To Serve Man" at the Internet Archive

1950 short stories
Alien visitations in fiction
Science fiction short stories
Hugo Award for Best Short Story winning works
Works originally published in Galaxy Science Fiction
Short stories by Damon Knight